The Coast Province was one of Kenya's eight provinces. It contained all of the country's coastline on the Indian Ocean. Its capital city was Mombasa. It was inhabited by the Mijikenda and Swahili peoples, among others. The province covered an area of 79,686.1 km2 .

Tourist attraction
Some of the province's important towns included Kilifi, Malindi, Watamu and Lamu in the north, and Mwandimu and Magunda in the south. Some of the coastal population was located in resort and beach settlements as Kiongwe and Kipini.

Diani Beach was one of the province's major tourist centres, with palm trees and the white sandy beaches like Mombasa.

Malindi is where Vasco da Gama picked up his pilot to navigate with the monsoon winds to India; Mambrui appears to be the site where contact occurred with the Chinese during the era of the Yongle Emperor and the expeditions of Zheng He.

Watamu is a small fishing community and contains East Africa's first marine national park, the Watamu Marine National Park.

Population data
The Coast Provinces had a population of 3,325,307 in 2009.

Climate 
The climate is designated as Aw in the Köppen climate classification system.

Economy

Mining 
Kwale mine

Separatism 
In 1999, the Mombasa Republican Council was formed, with the goal of engineering the Coast Province's secession from Kenya.

Dissolution 
In 2010, a new constitution came into effect which divided Kenya's 8 provinces into 47 counties. The Coast Province was divided into six: Mombasa, Kwale, Kilifi, Tana River, Lamu, and Taita–Taveta counties.

Villages and settlements (A-L)

Arabuko
Bengoni
Boma Upande
Bubesa
Busho
Chanani
Chengo
Chevani
Dambale
Dida Waredi
Dungich
Fanjua
Galamani
Galanema
Ganzoni
Gasi
Gifyonzo
Gogoni
Golbanti
Handampia
Hewani
Jiweni
Kabiboni
Kabieni
Kadzeweni
Kadzinuni
Kaembekaesha
Kajire
Kakomani
Kakoneni
Kakya
Kalaluwe
Kalota
Kamale
Kamleza
Kampi ya Kerengenzi
Kanjonja
Kasidi
Kaufumbani
Kavuluni
Kesanguri
Kibaya
Kiangwe
Kibandaongo
Kibirikani
Kibuguni
Kichangalaweni
Kidomaya
Kiduluni
Kiduruni
Kidutani
Kidzumo
Kiembekesha
Kifumbu
Kigato
Kigomberu
Kigombo
Kijangwani
Kijinitini
Kijipoa
Kiko Koni
Kikomani
Kikuyuni
Kikwezani
Kilibasi
Kililana
Kilole
Kilweni
Kimara Maganga
Kinagoni
Kinane
Kinarane
Kindunguni
Kinyadu
Kipendi
Kipungani
Kipusi
Kirewe
Kirumbi
Kirwilu
Kisaoni
Kisibu
Kisimachande
Kitere
Kitsantse
Kituu
Kiviogo
Kombo Kombo
Kongona
Kulelet
Kulesa
Kuruwetu
Kusitawi
Kwa Bechombo
Kwa Bwana Keri
Kwa Dadu
Kwa Mkamba
Kwademu
Kwaringoi
Lazima
Lenda, Kenya
Lukongo

Villages and settlements (M-Z)

Mabatani
Madabogo
Maduma
Mafigani
Magunda
Magunguni
Mahuruni
Majego
Majoreni
Majunguni
Makere
Makere ya Gwano
Makinyambu
Makobeni
Makondeni
Makongani
Makumbwani
Maledi
Malibati
Malka Jara
Mambore
Mambosasa
Manamare
Manyeso
Mapfanga
Mapotea
Mararui
Maranu
Mararani
Marigiza
Mariwinyi
Marongo
Maruvesa
Mashanda
Mashundwani
Massalani
Matapani
Matironi
Matolani
Maweu
Mbajumali
Mbaoni
Mbonea
Mbuji
Mbunboni
Mbwara Maganga
Mdzimure
Mdundonyi
Mgamboni
Mguya
Midoina
Mienzeni
Mikuani
Milalani
Milinga
Minjila
Mirarani
Misageni
Misaroni
Mitsolokani
Mizijini
Mkambini
Mkokoni
Mkomaniboi
Mkomba
Mkondo wa Simiti
Mkuluni
Mlegwa
Mlimani
Mnazi Moja
Mnazinia
Mnyenzeni
Mrangi
Mrugua
Msabaha
Msangatifu
Msuakini
Msumarini
Mteza
Mto Panga
Mtungi
Mudomo
Mugome
Muhaka Mbavu
Mukunguni
Mulemwa
Muliloni
Mulunguni
Munguvini
Muritu
Mutuli
Mvindeni
Mvuleni
Mwabani
Mwabaya Nyundo
Mwabila
Mwachirunge Bomu
Mwachirunje ya Pwani
Mwaembe
Mwaga
Mwaketutu
Mwakunde
Mwalili
Mwambiri
Mwamkuchi
Mwana Mwinga
Mwanachini
Mwanathumba
Mwandoni
Mwangoni
Mwangulu
Mwanyora
Mwakinyungu
Mwarungu
Mwazare
Mwazi
Mweza
Mwogahendi
Myabogi
Nasibu
Ndile
Ndome
Ngambinyi
Ngombani
Nguruweni
Ngutuni
Ngwaru
Ngwena
Njele
Nkunumbi
Nyalani
Nyambogi
Nyangwani
Rhoka
Ria Kalui
Safarisi
Saidibabo
Sailoni
Samicha
Samikaro
Selaloni
Semandaro
Sendeni
Shakadula
Shambini
Shambweni
Shelemba
Sungululu
Takwa Milinga
Thuva
Tindini
Waldena
Yedi

See also 
Mombasa County
Kwale County
Kilifi County
Tana River County
Lamu County 
Taita-Taveta County

References 

 
Provinces of Kenya
Former provinces
2013 disestablishments in Kenya